Durian River may refer to:

Ci Durian, a river in western Java, Indonesia 
Sungai Durian (disambiguation), various locations in Indonesia and Malaysia